The Status Civilization is a science fiction novel by American writer Robert Sheckley, first published in 1960.

The Status Civilization concerns Will Barrent, a man who finds himself, without memory of any crime or, indeed, of his previous life, being shipped across space to the planet Omega.

Omega, used to imprison extreme offenders, has a hierarchical society of extreme brutality, where the only way to advance (and avoid dying) is to commit an endless series of crimes. The average life expectancy from time of arrival on Omega is three years. The story concerns Barrent's attempt to survive, escape, and return to Earth to clear himself of the accusations against him.

Plot summary

Earth is a uniform, weakly structured, utopian society based on the mutual trust and conformity of its citizens. It is sleepy and stagnant, developing neither socially nor technologically. Its striking social stability is maintained by robots brainwashing children in "closed classes." The ideologies of both Earth and Omega resemble one another, differing only in words. On Omega, the citizens worship Evil (always capitalized) in a cult dedicated to an entity called The Black One. On Earth, the world religion is an amalgam of all the "good" aspects of previous Earth religions. Its institution is the Church of the Spirit of Mankind Incarnate.

As Barrent comes closer to the truth about the reasons for his incarceration, his Omegan consciousness conflicts with his subconsciousness which was programmed in the closed classes by the robots when he was a child. The subsequent psychological struggle is played out by repeating all of the previous fights and battles which Barrent experienced throughout the book, eventually making clear the vision (or "skrenning") which the mutant girl on Omega foresaw of Barrent's death.

Reception
Dave Langford reviewed The Status Civilization for White Dwarf #80, and stated that "unsubtle, action-packed fun with satirical touches, set on a world where crime is the law and the hero soon gets into trouble for non-drug addiction."

Reviews
Review by Alfred Bester (1960) in The Magazine of Fantasy and Science Fiction, December 1960
Review by Frederik Pohl (1961) in If, #8 [UK]
Review by John Carnell (1961) in New Worlds Science Fiction, #104 March
Review by P. Schuyler Miller (1961) in Analog Science Fact and Fiction, July 1961
Review by Joseph Nicholas (1979) in Paperback Parlour, August 1979
Review by Chris Morgan (1979) in Vector 95
Review by Martyn Taylor (1986) in Paperback Inferno, #62

References

External links
Official site of Robert Sheckley

 

1960 American novels
1960 science fiction novels
American science fiction novels
Dystopian novels
Novels by Robert Sheckley
Social science fiction
Signet Books books